The Abel polynomials in mathematics form a polynomial sequence, the nth term of which is of the form

The sequence is named after Niels Henrik Abel (1802-1829), the Norwegian mathematician.

This polynomial sequence is of binomial type: conversely, every polynomial sequence of binomial type may be obtained from the Abel sequence in the umbral calculus.

Examples
For , the polynomials are 

For , the polynomials are

References

External links
 

Polynomials